Aleksey Dmitrievich Kamkin (born 15 October 1952) is a retired Russian rower who had his best achievements in the coxless fours, together with Valeriy Dolinin, Aleksandr Kulagin and Vitaly Eliseyev. In this event they won a world title in 1981 and silver medals at the 1980 Summer Olympics and 1982 World Rowing Championships.

After retiring from competition Kamkin worked as a rowing coach at the national level. Between 1984 and 1991 he coached the Soviet Army team and prepared two national champions.

References

External links
 
 
 

1952 births
Living people
Russian male rowers
Soviet male rowers
Olympic rowers of the Soviet Union
Rowers at the 1980 Summer Olympics
Olympic silver medalists for the Soviet Union
Olympic medalists in rowing
World Rowing Championships medalists for the Soviet Union
Medalists at the 1980 Summer Olympics